The Newell A. Whiting House is a historic building located in Onawa, Iowa, United States.  Whiting was a hardware merchant and sawmill owner, who built this house for his second wife.  It is a simple, yet fairly pure, an example of the Italianate style constructed in the mid-19th century.  The -story brick house features bracketed eaves, wall dormers, tall, narrow windows with metal hood moldings, bay windows on the main floor, and alongside porch on the east elevation.  It is capped with a hip roof and a cupola.  The house was listed on the National Register of Historic Places in 1990.

References

Houses completed in 1882
Italianate architecture in Iowa
Onawa, Iowa
Buildings and structures in Monona County, Iowa
National Register of Historic Places in Monona County, Iowa
Houses on the National Register of Historic Places in Iowa